The 2017–18 season was Dunfermline Athletic's second season in the Scottish Championship, having finished 5th in the 2016–17 season.

Having finished the season fourth in the league, the club qualified for the quarter-final stage of the quarter-final stage of the Scottish Premiership play-offs. After a 0–0 draw with Dundee United at East End Park, the Pars lost the second leg 2–1 at Tannadice. Dunfermline also competed in the Scottish Challenge Cup, Scottish League Cup and the Scottish Cup, where they were knocked out by Falkirk, Rangers and Morton, respectively.

Season review

May
5 May 2017: After finishing fifth at the end of the 2016–17 season, manager Allan Johnston opted to offer new deals to the majority of the playing squad. Three first team players who were not offered new deals were Lewis Spence, Euan Spark, and Ben Richards-Everton, the last of which had struggled with injury during the 2016–17 season. Additionally, the club decided that they would not enter a youth side into the 2017–18 SPFL Development League with four youth players being subsequently released. Cammy Gill, Stuart Morrison, Scott Lochhead, Brandon Luke and Callum Smith were all promoted to the first-team.
8 May 2017: In the club's end of season address chairman Ross McArthur outlined the club's intentions of reaching a Scottish Premiership play-off place for the 2017–18 season, with a slightly smaller squad of players than in the previous season. Additionally, it was announced that work was due to begin on relaying East End Park's pitch after it was criticised for its condition towards the end of the previous season.
17 May 2017: The side completed their first signing of the 2017 summer transfer window, bringing in French defender Jean-Yves Mvoto on a one-year deal. Mvoto, who played most of his career in England, had previously played for Fife rivals Raith Rovers during the previous season.
31 May 2017: After the club's previous announcement on player releases, four further first-team players decided to leave East End Park following the end of their contracts. David Hutton, who made just 14 appearances over two season left to sign for recently promoted Scottish League One side Arbroath, whilst club captain Callum Fordyce signed for Championship rivals Queen of the South. Michael Moffat and Andy Geggan both signed for Ayr United, with both players having previously played with the Somerset Park side before playing for Dunfermline. At the time of his departure, Geggan was the longest serving Dunfermline player, having made almost 200 appearances, and was the final member of the squad who went through administration with the Pars in 2013.

June
23 June 2017: The fixtures for the coming SPFL season were released, with the Pars facing off against Scottish League One champions Livingston at Almondvale Stadium. The side's first home match was against recently relegated Inverness Caledonian Thistle, with the third fixture lining Dunfermline up against fierce rivals Falkirk at East End Park.
26 June 2017: To celebrate the 50 year anniversary of the club's 1968 Scottish Cup victory, the club launched their replica home kit for the 2017–18 in commemoration of the event.

July

August

September

October

November

December

January

February

March

Squad list

Results & fixtures

Pre-season

Scottish Championship

Scottish Premiership play-offs

Scottish League Cup

Table

Matches

Scottish Challenge Cup

Scottish Cup

Squad statistics

Appearances and goals
During the 2017–18 season, Dunfermline used twenty-seven different players in competitive matches. The table below shows the number of appearances and goals scored by each player. Right wing-back Ryan Williamson made the most appearances, playing forty-six out of a possible 48 games; Nicky Clark scored the most goal, with twenty-one in all competitions.

|-
|colspan="14"|Players away from the club on loan:

|-
|colspan="14"|Players who appeared for Dunfermline Athletic but left during the season:

|}
a.  Includes the Scottish Premiership play-offs.

Clean sheets
{| class="wikitable" style="font-size: 95%; text-align: center;"
|-
!width=15|
!width=15|
!width=15|
!width=150|Name
!width=80|Total
!width=80|Scottish Championship
!width=80|Scottish Cup
!width=80|Scottish League Cup
!width=80|Scottish Challenge Cup
!width=80|Scottish Premiership play-offs
|-
|25
|GK
|
|Lee Robinson
|12||11||||||||1
|-
|1
|GK
|
|Sean Murdoch
|8||4||||2||2||
|-
!colspan="4"| Total !! 20 !! 15 !! 0 !! 2 !! 2 !! 1

Goalscorers
During the 2017–18 season, fifteen Dunfermline players scored 84 goals in all competitions, with 1 goal having been an own goal scored by Peterhead defender Scott Ross. Striker Nicky Clark was the club's top scorer, with 21 goals in 48 competitive matches. Clark was the only player to have scored a hat-trick, scoring four in the first competitive fixture of the season against Elgin City and three against Championship opponents Brechin City and Queen of the South.

Disciplinary record

Club statistics

League table

Results by round

Results summary

Home attendances

{| class="wikitable sortable" style="text-align:center; font-size:90%"
|-
! scope="col" width=100 | Comp
! scope="col" width=120 | Date
! scope="col" width=60  | Score
! scope="col" width=250 class="unsortable" | Opponent
! scope="col" width=150 | Attendance
|-
|League Cup||15 July 2017||bgcolor="#CCFFCC"| 6–0 ||Elgin City||1,757
|-
|League Cup||22 July 2017||bgcolor="#CCFFCC"| 5–1 ||Peterhead||1,878
|-
|Championship||12 August 2017||bgcolor="#CCFFCC"| 5–1 ||Inverness CT||4,391
|-
|Challenge Cup||15 August 2017||bgcolor="#CCFFCC"| 2–0 ||Arbroath||1,462
|-
|Championship||19 August 2017||bgcolor="#CCFFCC"| 3–1 ||Falkirk||5,751
|-
|Championship||16 September 2017||bgcolor="#CCFFCC"| 3–0 ||St Mirren||6,628
|-
|Championship||30 September 2017||bgcolor="#FFCCCC"| 1–3 ||Dundee United||7,585
|-
|Championship||21 October 2017||bgcolor="#CCFFCC"| 3–1 ||Livingston||5,089
|-
|Championship||21 November 2017||bgcolor="FFFFCC"| 1–1 ||Greenock Morton||4,816
|-
|Championship||25 November 2017||bgcolor="FFFFCC"| 2–2 ||Dumbarton||4,505
|-
|Championship||9 December 2017||bgcolor="FFCCCC"| 2–5 ||Queen of the South||4,694
|-
|Championship||23 December 2017||bgcolor="CCFFCC"| 2–1 ||Brechin City||4,595
|-
|Championship||2 January 2018||bgcolor="#CCFFCC"| 2–0 ||Falkirk||7,140
|-
|Championship||13 January 2018||bgcolor="FFFFCC"| 0–0 ||Dundee United||7,139
|-
|Scottish Cup||20 January 2018||bgcolor="FFCCCC"| 1–2 ||Greenock Morton||2,573
|-
|Championship||26 January 2018||bgcolor="#FFCCCC"| 1–2 ||St Mirren||5,479
|-
|Championship||13 March 2018||bgcolor="#CCFFCC"| 1–0 ||Inverness CT||2,249
|-
|Championship||17 March 2018||bgcolor="FFFFCC"| 0–0 ||Greenock Morton||4,816
|-
|Championship||31 March 2018||bgcolor="#CCFFCC"| 3–1 ||Queen of the South||4,762
|-
|Championship||3 April 2018||bgcolor="#CCFFCC"| 1–0 ||Livingston||4,572
|-
|Championship||14 April 2018||bgcolor="#CCFFCC"| 4–0 ||Brechin City||4,898
|-
|Championship||28 April 2018||bgcolor="#CCFFCC"| 4–0 ||Dumbarton||5,506
|-
|Championship||1 May 2018||bgcolor="#FFFFCC"| 0–0 ||Dundee United||6,474
|-
|bgcolor="#C0C0C0"|
|bgcolor="#C0C0C0"|
|bgcolor="#C0C0C0"|
| Average league attendance:
| 5,243
|-
|bgcolor="#C0C0C0"|
|bgcolor="#C0C0C0"|
|bgcolor="#C0C0C0"|
| Total league attendance:
| 94,382
|-
|bgcolor="#C0C0C0"|
|bgcolor="#C0C0C0"|
|bgcolor="#C0C0C0"|
| Average total attendance:
| 4,718
|-
|bgcolor="#C0C0C0"|
|bgcolor="#C0C0C0"|
|bgcolor="#C0C0C0"|
| Total attendance:
| 108,526

Awards

Monthly

Scottish Championship Manager of the Month

Scottish Championship Player of the Month

Club

End of Season

PFA Scotland

Club

Transfers

First team

Players in

Players out

Loans in

Loans out

Development squad

Players out

Contract extensions

Notes

References

Dunfermline Athletic F.C. seasons
Dunfermline Athletic